Kings Avenue may refer to:

Kings Avenue (JTA Skyway), a station on the JTA Skyway in Jacksonville, Florida
Kings Avenue, Canberra, a road in Canberra
Königsallee, a boulevard in Düsseldorf
Kings Avenue Mall, a shopping mall located in Paphos, Cyprus
King's Avenue, Singapore, a road in Sembawang